"Say Hello to Someone in Massachusetts", was made the official Polka of Massachusetts on October 1, 1998. It was written by Lenny Gomulka.

External links
 The law designating the official polka of Massachusetts
 Lyrics to Say Hello to Someone in  Massachusetts
 Another site for lyrics

Massachusetts
Music of Massachusetts
Polkas
Songs about Massachusetts